Fabián Gustavo Moyano Batres (born 2 January 1986) is an Argentine footballer.

Honours

Club
Lanús
 Torneo Apertura: 2007

External links
 Moyano at Football Lineups

1986 births
Living people
Argentine footballers
Argentine expatriate footballers
Boca Juniors footballers
Club Atlético Lanús footballers
Club Atlético Atlanta footballers
San Luis de Quillota footballers
Deportes Iberia footballers
Expatriate footballers in Chile
Primera B de Chile players
Association football goalkeepers
Sportspeople from Mendoza, Argentina